Luka Lesosky-Hay (born 1 July 2001) is an Australian rules footballer who played for the Richmond Football Club in the AFL Women's (AFLW). After a junior career with the Geelong Falcons in the NAB League Girls competition, Lesosky-Hay was overlooked at the 2019 draft. She was later selected to join Richmond as a train-on injury replacement player during the 2020 AFL Women's season but did not earn a league debut that season. Later that year, Lesosky-Hay was drafted by Richmond with their third selection and fifty-third overall in the 2020 AFL Women's draft. She made her debut against  at Punt Road Oval in the opening round of the 2021 season. She was delisted by Richmond in April 2021.

References

External links 
 

2001 births
Living people
Richmond Football Club (AFLW) players
Geelong Falcons players (NAB League Girls)
Australian rules footballers from Victoria (Australia)